Drillia rosolina is a species of sea snail, a marine gastropod mollusk in the family Drilliidae.

The species was unsatisfactory described by Frederick Price Marrat (1820-1904) and he didn't provide an image. According to Powell (1966) this species is a synonym of  Drillia rosacea (Reeve, 1845).

Description
The shell grows to a length of 25 mm. This species resembles Drillia rosacea, but is obliquely ribbed, closely striated, and of uniform rose color. The color, according to Philippe Dautzenberg, is variable and may also be whitish with a dark brown band on the body whorl.

Distribution
This species occurs in the demersal zone of the Atlantic Ocean off Gabon.

References

 Gofas, S.; Afonso, J.P.; Brandào, M. (Ed.). (S.a.). Conchas e Moluscos de Angola = Coquillages et Mollusques d'Angola. [Shells and molluscs of Angola]. Universidade Agostinho / Elf Aquitaine Angola: Angola. 140 pp
 Bernard, P.A. (Ed.) (1984). Coquillages du Gabon [Shells of Gabon]. Pierre A. Bernard: Libreville, Gabon. 140, 75 plates pp.
  Tucker, J.K. 2004 Catalog of recent and fossil turrids (Mollusca: Gastropoda). Zootaxa 682:1–1295

External links
 

Endemic fauna of Gabon
rosolina
Gastropods described in 1877